Lucien De Muynck (1 August 1931 – 24 October 1999) was a Belgian middle-distance runner. He competed in the men's 800 metres at the 1952 Summer Olympics.

References

1931 births
1999 deaths
Athletes (track and field) at the 1952 Summer Olympics
Belgian male middle-distance runners
Olympic athletes of Belgium
Place of birth missing